Symphony No. 1 is a ballet made by New York City Ballet ballet master (subsequently ballet master in chief) Peter Martins to Tschaikovsky's Symphony No. 1 in G minor, Op. 13, Winter Dreams (1866–74). The premiere took place 6 June 1981, as part of City Ballet's Tschaikovsky Festival at the New York State Theater, Lincoln Center.

Original cast
   
Darci Kistler
Lisa Hess
Lourdes Lopez
 
Sean Lavery
Afshin Mofid
Kipling Houston

Ballets by Peter Martins
Ballets to the music of Pyotr Ilyich Tchaikovsky
1981 ballet premieres
New York City Ballet Tschaikovsky Festival
New York City Ballet repertory